Irish singer Niall Horan has received 18 awards and 34 nominations. Among them, he has won an American Music Award and iHeartRadio Music Awards.

American Music Awards 

!
|-
|2017
|Niall Horan
|New Artist of the Year
|
| 
|}

BMI Awards

BMI London Awards

!
|-
|2016
|"Night Changes"
|Pop Award Songs
|
| 
|-
|rowspan=1|2017
|rowspan=1| "This Town"
|Pop Award Songs
|
| 
|-
|2018
|"Slow Hands"
|Pop Award Songs
|
| 
|-
|rowspan=2|2019
|"Too Much to Ask"
|rowspan="2"| Pop Award Songs
|
|rowspan="2"|
|-
|"On the Loose"
|
|-
|2020
|"Nice to Meet Ya"
|Pop Award Songs
|
|
|-
|2021
|"Moral of the Story"
|Pop Award Songs
|
|
|}

BMI Pop Awards

!
|-
|rowspan=2| 2018
|"Slow Hands"
|rowspan="2"| Award-Winning Songs
| 
|rowspan="2"|
|-
|"This Town"
|
|}

Choice Music Prize 

!
|-
|2017 
|This Town
|rowspan="3"|Song of the Year 
| 
| 
|-
|2018
|Slow Hands
| 
| 
|-
|2021
|No Judgement
|
|
|}

Global Awards 

!
|-
| rowspan=16| 2018
| "Slow Hands"
| Best Song
| rowspan=3 
| rowspan=3|
|-
| rowspan=2| Niall Horan
| Best Male
|-
| Best Pop
|}

iHeartRadio Music Awards 

!
|-
|2017
|Niall Horan
|Best Solo Breakout
|  
| 
|-
|rowspan="5"|2018
|rowspan="3" |Niall Horan
| Best New Pop Artist
| 
| rowspan="5"| 
|-
| Best New Artist
| rowspan=2 
|-
| Best Solo Breakout
|-
| "Slow Hands"
|Best lyrics
| 
|-
| "Issues"
|Best Cover Song
| 
|-
|2019
|"Crying in the Club"
|Best Cover Song
| 
|
|}

iHeartRadio Titanium Awards 
iHeartRadio Titanium Awards are awarded to an artist when their song reaches 1 Billion Spins across iHeartRadio Stations.

iHeartRadio MuchMusic Video Awards 

!
|-
|2017
|Niall Horan
|Fan Fave International Artist or Group
|
|
|}

People's Choice Awards 

!
|-
|2017
|Niall Horan
|Favourite Breakout Artist
|
|
|}

Radio Disney Music Awards

!
|-
|2017
|Niall Horan
|Best Male Artist
|
|
|}

Teen Choice Awards

!
|-
| rowspan=2 |2017
|"Slow Hands"
| Choice Song: Male Artist 
|
| 
|-
|Niall Horan
| Choice Summer Male Artist ||  ||
|-
|rowspan=3|2018
|rowspan=2|Niall Horan 
| Choice Male Artist 
|rowspan=3  
|rowspan="3"| 
|-
|Choice Summer Male Artist
|-
|Flicker World Tour
|Choice Summer Tour 
|-
|2019
|"What a Time"
|Choice Collaboration
|
|
|}

TeleHit Awards

!
|-
|2017
|"Slow Hands"
|Video in English 
|
|
|}

Hollywood Music in Media Awards

!
|-
|2018
|"Finally Free"
|Original Song – Animated Film 
|
|
|}

References

Horan, Niall